W0LF(S) is a Taiwanese band that was formed in 2020 with five members, Wayne Huang, Qiu Fengze and .

The group was first formed with four members: Wayne Huang,  and Qiu Fengze. Formerly called W0LF, they came to be known as W0LF(S) in 2020, with the addition of Mandopop rapper, . The name W0LF(S) was originated from various initials in the members' names.

Members

Wayne Huang
Stage name: Wayne Huang, Huang Weijin
Real name: Huang Weijin
Date of birth: 23 March 1990
Place of birth:  Taipei, Taiwan

Stage name: Nine Chen, Chen Lingjiu
Real name: Chen Chih-hao 
Date of birth: 9 April 1987 
Place of birth:  Kaohsiung, Taiwan

Stage name: Lai, Xiao Lai, Lai Yanju
Real name: Lai Chieh-hung
Date of birth: 16 January 1991
Place of birth:  Taichung, Taiwan

Qiu Fengze
Stage name: Qiu Fengze
Real name: Kenny Khoo
Date of birth: 31 October 1988
Place of birth:  Singapore

Stage name: SHOU, Lou Junshuo
Real name: Lou Junshuo
Date of birth: 14 September 1992
Place of birth:  Hualien, Taiwan

Timeline

History

2019: Formation of W0LF
On November 6, 2019, during the live broadcast of "100% Entertainment", Qiu Fengze, Nine Chen and Huang Weijin announced that they would form a four-member group with Lai.

The group released their first single Betrayal the same month after the announcement, followed by Modern Love on April 9, 2020.

2020: Renamed to W0LF(S)

Following the inclusion of SHOU, the group released their first single titled All Day under the name of W0LF(S).

In October 2020, W0LF(S) released their second single #反正我好看 in partnership with Samsung for the launch of Samsung Galaxy S20 FE 5G in Taiwan.

2021 - Present

In May 2021, the band released their third single I Wanna Holiday in partnership with Agoda, followed by a song amid the global COVID-19 pandemic titled No Boundaries in September 2021. They also sang the 5th anniversary theme song for Arena of Valor titled Ride On which was released on 29 October 2021. The group released the title track of their first album - Moon Landing on 1 December 2021.

The group released Be A Liar on 20 January 2022, the launch date of the preorder for their first album. In March 2022, they sang the mandarin theme song for Turning Red
, an American fantasy comedy film produced by Pixar Animation Studios and distributed by Walt Disney Studios Motion Pictures. They released LALALA on 14 July 2022 to commemorate their second anniversary.

On 14 October 2022, W0LF(S) held their first overseas concert in Singapore at The Star Theatre.

Discography

Singles

Awards and nominations

References

External links
五堅情 Official Facebook Page
五堅情 Official Instagram Page
五堅情 Official YouTube Channel

Mandopop musical groups
Musical groups established in 2019
2019 establishments in Taiwan
Taiwanese idols